Robert MacFarlane or McFarlane may refer to:

General
 Robert Macfarlan (schoolmaster) (1734–1804), Scottish writer, journalist and translator
 Sir Robert Henry MacFarlane (1771–1843), British Army officer during the Napoleonic Wars
 Robert MacFarlane, Lord Ormidale (1802–1880), Scottish advocate and law lord
 Robert MacFarlane (Canadian politician) (1835–1872), Canadian politician
 Robert Stetson Macfarlane (1899–1982), American businessman
 Robert Macfarlane (New Zealand politician) (1900–1982), New Zealand politician
 Robert Gwyn Macfarlane (1907–1987), British hematologist
 Robert McFarlane (1937–2022), American politician
 Robert McFarlane (photographer) (born 1942), Australian photographer
 Robert Macfarlane (writer) (born 1976), British travel writer

Sports
 Robert McFarlane (cricketer) (born 1955), Australian cricketer
 Rab Macfarlane (1875–1943), Scottish footballer
 Bob McFarlane (footballer, died 1898) (?–1898), Scottish footballer
 Bob McFarlane (footballer, born 1887) (1887–1955), Scottish footballer and engineer
 Bobby McFarlane (1913–1971), Scottish footballer
 Bob McFarlane (Canadian athlete) (1927–2006), Canadian runner, football player and plastic surgeon